Dr Jenni Fagan (born 1977) is a Scottish novelist and poet. She has written several books including fiction novel The Panopticon, screenplays and several books of poetry. She was named Scottish writer of the year 2016 by The Glasgow Herald.

Early life

Fagan was born in 1977 and grew up in Scotland within the Scottish Local Authority care system. As a child she was adopted twice but neither placement worked out well. She spent 6 years living on a caravan park.  and states while she was a child she moved 26 times. After leaving the care system Fagan was also homeless for several years, living in homeless accommodation.

In 2007 she received the Dewar Arts award which enabled her to attend Norwich School of Art and Design and go on to read for a BA at University of Greenwich from which she graduated first class. She went on to study for a MA at Royal Holloway, University of London where she was taught by Andrew Motion. She completed a PhD at The University of Edinburgh, her thesis is on Structuralism.

Career

With the publication of her first novel in 2013, Fagan was listed by Granta as one of the 2013 Granta Best of Young British Novelists. The Panopticon was well received in the press, with New York Times describing her writing, "...there is no resisting the tidal rollout of Fagan’s imagery. Her prose beats behind your eyelids..." and also describing Fagan as The Patron Saint of Literary Street Urchins. "

Her second novel, The Sunlight Pilgrims released in 2016, tells the story of a transgender young girl named Stella who lives on a caravan park and is based around the relationships she forms while growing up, set against a backdrop of rural Scotland during a period freezing climate change. Writer Ben Myers described it as "prose that sparkles from the first page."

Fagan was shortlisted for the BBC National Short Story Award in 2017 with The Waken.

Fagan mentors young writers, and works with young people including offenders and those in the prison system. She curated an art exhibition at Tramway in Glasgow entitled Narrative for Koestler Trust in 2017. It showcased artwork by prisoners, young offenders and those in secure psychiatric care from all across Scotland.

In 2017, as part of the Edinburgh International Book Festival, Fagan and 4 other Scottish writers took part in the Outriders Project, which involved taking road trips across the continent of America with local writers to explore partnerships while writing and blogging throughout the journey. Fagan's journey entailed travelling from the Rust Belt to Silicon Valley where she explored "questions on the nature of truth." She was accompanied by American novelist Bonnie Jo Campbell. The subsequent book length poem called TRUTH was published by Tangerine Press in Autumn 2019.

It was during a writing residency at Shakespeare and Company in Paris she wrote some of the poetry which made up her poetry collection There’s a Witch in the Word Machine. 

She has been Writer in Residence at the University of Edinburgh, Lewisham Hospital's neonatal unit, Norfolk Blind Association, and has collaborated with a women's prison and various youth organisations over many years. She was a Robert Louis Stevenson Fellow at Grez-sur-Loing for a month in 2018 supported by The Scottish Book Trust.

She directed her first short film in 2018, a cine-poem about Bangour Village Hospital where she was born. She has also experimented with other media such as sculpture, when she created a giant metal scold's bridle onto which she engraved words by women prisoners from the UK and USA, including submissions from women on death row.

Books

Fiction novels
The Panopticon (2012)
The Sunlight Pilgrims (2016)
Luckenbooth (2021)
Hex (2022)

Non-Fiction
Ootlin (2023)

Poetry
Urchin Belle (2009)
Impilo/The Acid Burn No Face Man (2012) Bottle of Smoke Press
The Dead Queen of Bohemia: New & Collected Poems (2016)
There's A Witch in the Word Machine (2018)
Truth (2019)
The Bone Library (2022)

Awards
2013: Waterstones 11 – one of eleven best worldwide debuts in 2013
2013: Named in the Granta list of Best Young British Novelists
2016: Scottish Author of the Year, Sunday Herald Culture Awards, for The Sunlight Pilgrims

References

External links
Bangour Village Hospital (film) on Vimeo

Scottish women novelists
21st-century Scottish women writers
Place of birth missing (living people)
Living people
1977 births
Scottish women poets
Alumni of the University of London